Ectoedemia chlorantis is a moth of the  family Nepticulidae. It was described by Edward Meyrick in 1928. It is known from Ontario.

The wingspan is about 9 mm.

References

Nepticulidae
Moths of North America
Moths described in 1928